Guiyu may refer to:

Guiyu oneiros (鬼鱼), extinct bony fish
Guiyu (town) (贵屿镇), town in Chaoyang District, Shantou, Guangdong, China